Udayana Chaminda Kirindigoda is a Sri Lankan lawyer, politician and Member of Parliament. He is the son of late attorney Upali Kirindigoda. He has studied at Dharmaraja College Kandy and Sri Lanka Law College .

Kirindigoda is a member of Viyathmaga (Path of the Learned), a network of academics, businesspeople and professionals. He contested the 2020 parliamentary election as a Sri Lanka People's Freedom Alliance electoral alliance candidate in Kandy District and was elected to the Parliament of Sri Lanka.

References

Living people
Members of the 16th Parliament of Sri Lanka
Sinhalese lawyers
Sinhalese politicians
Sri Lanka People's Freedom Alliance politicians
Sri Lanka Podujana Peramuna politicians
1970 births
Alumni of Dharmaraja College